Golubić is a Serbo-Croatian surname, derived from the word golub, meaning "pigeon". Its literal meaning is "little pigeon". Notable people with the surname include:

 Grgur Golubić (fl. 1347–1361), Serbian nobleman
 Mustafa Golubić (1889–1941) Bosnian guerrilla and spy
 Theodore Roy Golubic (1928–1998), American sculptor
 Thomas Golubić, American movie and television music supervisor
 Dijana Jovetić née Golubić (born 1984), Croatian handball player
 Viktorija Golubic (born 1992), Swiss tennis player

See also
Golubović, surname
Golubić (disambiguation)

Bosnian surnames
Croatian surnames
Serbian surnames
Patronymic surnames